The saints of the Society of Jesus (also known as the Jesuits) are listed here alphabetically. The list includes Jesuit saints from Europe, Asia, Africa and the Americas. Since the founder of the Jesuits, St Ignatius of Loyola, was canonised in 1622, there have been 52 other Jesuits canonised.

A 
 José de Anchieta (1534–1597), Spanish missionary to Brazil.
 Modeste Andlauer (1847–1900), martyred in China during the Boxer Rebellion.
 Edmund Arrowsmith (1585–1628), one of the Forty Martyrs of England and Wales.

B 
 Robert Bellarmine (1542–1621), Cardinal and Doctor of the Church.
 John Berchmans (1599–1621), Belgian seminarian.
 Jacques Berthieu (1838–1896), French missionary who died as a martyr in Madagascar.
 Andrew Bobola (1591–1657), Polish martyr.
 Francis Borgia (1510–1572), third Superior General of the Society of Jesus.
 John de Brebeuf (1593–1649), French-Canadian martyr.
 Alexander Briant (1556–1581), one of the Forty Martyrs of England and Wales.
 John de Brito (1647–1693), Portuguese missionary martyred in India.

C 
 Edmund Campion (1540–1581), one of the Forty Martyrs of England and Wales.
 Peter Canisius (1521–1597), significant figure in the Counter-Reformation, Doctor of the Church.
 Juan de Castillo (1596–1628), martyred in Paraguay.
 Noël Chabanel (1613–1649), one of the Canadian Martyrs.
 Peter Claver (1580–1654), Spanish missionary in South America.
 Claude de la Colombiere (1641–1682), Spiritual director and writer.

D 
 Anthony Daniel (1601–1648), one of the Canadian Martyrs.
 Paul Denn (1847–1900), martyred in China during the Boxer Rebellion.

E 
 Philip Evans (1645–1679), one of the Forty Martyrs of England and Wales.

F 
 Peter Favre (1506–1546), first French Jesuit and co-founder of the Society.

G 
 Thomas Garnet (1575–1608), one of the Forty Martyrs of England and Wales.
 Charles Garnier (1606–1649), martyred at Sainte-Marie among the Hurons.
 Francis de Geronimo (1642–1716), Italian missionary.
 Aloysius Gonzaga (1568–1591), Italian, patron saint of young Christians.
 Roque González de Santa Cruz (1576–1628), the film The Mission is based on his life.
 John Soan de Goto (1578–1597), one of the Twenty-six Martyrs of Japan.
 Rene Goupil (1608–1642), French missionary and one of the first North American martyrs.
 Melchior Grodziecki (1582–1619), Polish martyr.

H 

 Alberto Hurtado (1901–1952), Chilean social reformer.

I 
 Rémy Isoré (1852–1900), martyred in China during the Boxer Rebellion.
 Ignatius of Loyola (1491–1556), co-founder of the Society of Jesus.

J 
 Isaac Jogues (1607–1646), one of the Canadian Martyrs.

K 
 James Kisai (1533-1597), one of the Twenty-six Martyrs of Japan.
 Stanislaus Kostka (1550–1568), Polish novice.

L 
 Jean de Lalande (died 1646), martyred at Sainte-Marie among the Hurons.
 Gabriel Lalemant (1610–1649), one of the Canadian Martyrs.
 David Lewis (1616–1679), one of the Forty Martyrs of England and Wales.

M 

 Lèon-Ignance Mangin (1857–1900), martyred in China during the Boxer Rebellion.
 Paul Miki (1562–1597), one of the Twenty-six Martyrs of Japan.
 Henry Morse (1595–1645), one of the Forty Martyrs of England and Wales.

O 
 John Ogilvie (1579–1615), Scottish Jesuit martyr during reign of James VI.
 Alfonso Rodríguez Olmedo (1598-1628), Spanish missionary to Paraguay.
 Nicholas Owen (c. 1550–1606), built priest holes in the reign of Queen Elizabeth I of England.

P 
 Joseph Pignatelli (1737–1811), unofficial leader of the Jesuits during the Suppression of the Society of Jesus.
 Stephen Pongracz (1584–1619), martyr from Transylvania.

R 
 Bernardino Realino (1530–1616), pastor of Lecce.
 John Francis Regis (1597–1640), French priest.
 Alphonsus Rodriguez (1532–1617), Jesuit brother, Spanish writer and mystic.
 José María Rubio (1864–1929), Spanish priest, canonized in 2003.

S 

 Robert Southwell (c. 1561–1595), one of the Forty Martyrs of England and Wales.
 André de Soveral (1572–1645), Brazilian, one of the Martyrs of Natal.

W 
 Henry Walpole (1558–1595), one of the Forty Martyrs of England and Wales.

X 
 Francis Xavier (1506–1552), co-founder of the Society of Jesus, Spanish missionary to Asia.

See also 
 List of Jesuits
 List of Catholic martyrs of the English Reformation
 North American Martyrs
 Vietnamese Martyrs
 Japanese Martyrs
 Chinese Martyrs

References

List
Lists of Roman Catholics